Carrigallen is a barony in County Leitrim, Republic of Ireland.

Etymology
Carrigallen barony takes its name from the village of Carrigallen ("beautiful stone").

Location

Carrigallen is found in southeast County Leitrim, stretching from Bencroy to Garadice Lough to Gulladoo Lough.

Carrigallen barony is bordered to the west by Drumahaire and Leitrim; to the south by Mohill (all the preceding baronies are also in County Leitrim); to the north by Tullyhaw, County Cavan; to the east by Tullyhunco, County Cavan; to the southeast by Longford and Granard, County Longford.

History
The Mag Dorchaidh (Darcy) were chiefs of Cenél-Luachain in the modern parish of Oughteragh. The MacRannall chiefs held much of this barony as part of the territory called Conmaicne Mag Rein.  During at least the 19th and 20th centuries, three annual fairs were held at Longfield townland on – 16 May, 10 October, and 27 December, while four annual fairs were held at Carrigallen on- 7 May, 9 August, 8 October, and 31 December.

Museum artefacts
There are a number of medieval artifacts from Carrigallen barony preserved in a collection at the  Royal Irish Academy museum in Dublin. A Celt was found in the bed of the river at Ballyheedy bridge, at Ardrum downland near Ballinamore in county Leitrim, a good long narrow specimen, of bright yellow bronze, triangular shaped, flat-surfaced, and roughly decorated with a hammered fan-tailed ornament radiating towards the blade.

List of settlements

Below is a list of settlements in Carrigallen barony:
Ballinamore
Carrigallen

References

Primary sources

Secondary sources

. Digitized 2011 from original in Lyon Public Library

Baronies of County Leitrim